804 Naval Air Squadron (804 NAS) was a Naval Air Squadron of the Royal Navy, formed in November 1939 from part of 769 NAS Sea Gladiators which had been detached to RNAS Hatston. The squadron was merged into 800 NAS in June 1944 and subsequently reformed in September.

World War II
During World War II, she was equipped with various aircraft types in differing roles. Between May and September 1940 804 squadron returned to Hatston, and was subsequently recognised as one of the two FAA squadrons that operated with RAF Fighter Command in the Battle of Britain.

In October 1940 804 Squadron was re-equipped with Martlet I fighters, and first operated the new fighters out of RNAS Skaebrae in the Orkney Islands in October 1940. On 25 December 1940, two of the squadrons Martlets shot down a Junkers Ju 88 off Scapa Flow, thus scoring the first aerial victory in Europe by any variant of the Grumman F4F Wildcat. Further re-equipping occurred in February 1941 at RNAS Yeovilton with Fulmar IIs and Sea Hurricanes.

In April 1941 the squadron was assigned to operate from catapult-armed ships (CAM ships and fighter catapult ships) until this role was taken over by the RAF's Merchant Ship Fighter Unit in May 1942. In August 1941, an 804 Squadron Sea Hurricane from HMS Maplin, piloted by Robert Everett, shot down an Fw 200 Condor, the first such victory for a catapult launched aircraft.

In July 1942, the squadron escorted Gibraltar convoys on board  and later, in October, now equipped with the Sea Hurricane IIc, joined  for the North African landings. The squadron was re-equipped yet again in August 1943 Hellcat Is and in October joined No 7 Naval Fighter Wing.

The squadron participated in the successful attack on 3 April 1944 on the German battleship Tirpitz (Operation Tungsten) in Altafjord, northern Norway.

In June 1944, 804 was absorbed into 800 squadron.

Post-war
She participated in the Korean War, flying off HMS Glory. She was recommissioned at RNAS Lossiemouth on 1 March 1960. The squadron was equipped with 6 Supermarine Scimitar F MK1 aircraft under the command of Lieutenant Commander T. Binney RN. The 800 Series of Naval Air Squadrons were allocated to carrier and land based operational squadrons of the Fleet Air Arm. Other than for two periods ashore at Lossiemouth, the squadron operated from Hermes until the unit disbanded in September 1961. The squadron took part in both the Farnborough Airshow and the Paris Air Show in 1961, operating from the deck of Hermes rather than a shore base and flying directly to and from the shows.

References

Citations

Bibliography
Angelucci, Enzo. The American Fighter: The Definitive Guide to American Fighter Aircraft From 1917 to the Present. New York: Orion Books, 1987. .
Scimitar by D. Gibbings & J. A. Gorman, 
Jackson, Robert "The Encyclopedia of Military Aircraft" Parragon Books, Ltd. 2006 

800 series Fleet Air Arm squadrons